The Journal of Dietary Supplements is a quarterly peer-reviewed scientific journal that covers research in any area involving dietary supplements. It is abstracted and indexed in CABI, Academic Search Complete, Biological Abstracts, PubMed/MEDLINE, EMBASE, BIOSIS Previews, and the Emerging Sources Citation Index. The journal was established in 1996 as the Journal of Nutraceuticals, Functional & Medical Foods and was published by Haworth Press. It changed to its present title in 2004 and has been published since 2008 by Taylor & Francis.

Editors-in-chief

The following persons are or have been Editor-in-chief:
1996-2004: Nancy M. Childs
2005-2006: Shawn M. Talbott
2007-2018: Catherine Ulbricht
2018-present: Taylor C. Wallace

References

External links

Publications established in 1996
Quarterly journals
English-language journals
Taylor & Francis academic journals
Nutrition and dietetics journals